Sultan Mahmud Babu is a Bangladesh Nationalist Party politician and the former Member of Parliament from Jamalpur-2.

Career
Babu was elected to Parliament from Jamalpur-2 as a candidate of Bangladesh Nationalist Party in 2001. He served in the  parliamentary standing committee on Housing and Public Works Ministry. He criticised ASM Abdul Halim, the cabinet secretary, for joining Bangladesh Nationalist Party one month after retiring from the civil service in October 2006. He received the nomination from the Bangladesh Nationalist Party in the 2008 election in Jamalpur-2.

References

Living people
Year of birth missing (living people)
Bangladesh Nationalist Party politicians
People from Jamalpur District
6th Jatiya Sangsad members
8th Jatiya Sangsad members